Myllokunmingia is a genus of basal chordate from the Lower Cambrian Maotianshan shales of China 518 to 490 mya and is thought to be a vertebrate, although this is not conclusively proven. The species M. fengjiaoa is 28 mm long and 6 mm high. It is among the oldest possible craniates, found in the lower Cambrian Chengjiang. It appears to have a skull and skeletal structures made of cartilage. There is no sign of biomineralization of the skeletal elements. The holotype was found in the Yuanshan member of the Qiongzhusi Formation in the Eoredlichia Zone near Haikou at Ercaicun, Kunming City, Yunnan, China. Only one species is known – Myllokunmingia fengjiaoa (Shu, Zhang & Han). Related creatures are Haikouichthys and Zhongjianichthys.

The animal has a distinct head and trunk with a forward sail-like (1.5 mm) dorsal fin and a ventral finfold (probably paired) further back. The maximum height of M. fengijaoa is at 6mm. The maximum height point is located around 11mm from the anterior. The head has five or six gill pouches with hemibranchs.  In the trunk there are 25 segments (myomeres) with rearward-facing chevrons. There is a notochord, a pharynx and a digestive tract that may run all the way to the rear tip of the animal. The mouth cannot be clearly identified. There may be a pericardial cavity. There are no fin radials on M. fengijaoa. There is only one specimen, which has the tip of the tail buried in sediment.

See also

 Haikouichthys
 Haikouella

References

External links
 http://www.sciencenews.org/sn_arc99/11_6_99/fob1.htm
 https://web.archive.org/web/20030511135309/http://www.gs-rc.org/repo/repoe.htm
 Lower Cambrian vertebrates from south China
 Oldest fossil fish caught

Prehistoric jawless fish genera
Maotianshan shales fossils
Cambrian fish

la:Myllokunmingia fengjiaoa
Cambrian chordates
Cambrian genus extinctions